MCD, Mcd or mcd may refer to:

Science
 Magnetic circular dichroism, with polarized light
 Malonyl-CoA decarboxylase, an enzyme involved in fatty acid biosynthesis
 Mesoscale convective discussion, Storm Prediction Center forecast 
 Millicandela (mcd) or Megacandela (Mcd), units of brightness or light intensity

Medical
 Minimal change disease, a disease of the kidney 
 Multicentric Castleman's disease, a sub-type of Castleman's disease

Technology
 Magnetic chip detector, in engines
 Maxi single or Maxi single Compact Disc
 Mega CD, a console by Sega
 Mini compact disc
 .mcd, a Mathcad document file

Transportation
 Mackinac Island Airport (IATA airport code), in Michigan, US
 Merced station (Amtrak) (station code), California, US
 Moscow Central Diameters, commuter rail system in Moscow, Russia

Organisations
 MCD Productions, an Irish event promoter
 MCD, an imprint of Farrar, Straus and Giroux
 McDonald's, restaurant chain, NYSE stock ticker 
 Melbourne College of Divinity
 Monte Carlo Doualiya, a French public radio service in the Middle East
 Municipal Corporation of Delhi

Other uses
 1400 (Roman numerals)
 M Countdown, a South Korean music TV program
 Marshall, Carter, and Dark, a fictional firm for trading paranormal wares from the SCP Foundation.
 Minecraft Dungeons, a video game
 Minor civil division, a geographical term used by the United States Census Bureau
 North Macedonia (UNDP code: MCD), a sovereign state in Europe

See also
 Measurement, Calibration and Diagnosis, with the Association for Standardisation of Automation and Measuring Systems